Madison Central High School is a public high school located in Richmond, Kentucky, United States. The school has an enrollment of approximately 2000 students.

History
The original Central High School was built in 1938 and was one of several small high schools in Madison County. Additions were made to the school beginning in 1953 and Madison Central (consolidated) High School was opened in the fall of 1954. Central was a consolidation of four Madison County system high schools (Central, Kingston, Waco and Kirksville). It was the lone high school in the county system until Madison Southern High School was opened in the fall of 1988. In 1989, Richmond's city high school (Madison) was dissolved and its students were moved to Central. Madison Central currently serves the citizens of Richmond and the northern sector of Madison County.

In 2003, the school underwent a major renovation project, which included a new cafeteria. In 2005–2006, an auditorium was built on the school campus, as well as remodeling the hallway section that leads to it and the health building gymnasium, and new sets of classrooms and a lecture hall under the auditorium.

The principal is Brandon Fritz.

References

External links
 
 Madison County School District

Schools in Madison County, Kentucky
Public high schools in Kentucky
Richmond, Kentucky